Construction by Jean-François Mertens and Zamir implementing with  John Harsanyi's proposal to model games with incomplete information by supposing that each player is characterized by a privately known type that describes his feasible strategies and payoffs as well as a probability distribution over other players' types.

Such probability distribution at the first level can be interpreted as a low level belief of a player. One level up the probability on the belief of other players is interpreted as beliefs on beliefs. A recursive universal construct is built—in which player have beliefs on their beliefs at different level—this construct is called the hierarchy of beliefs.

The result is a universal space of types in which, subject to specified consistency conditions, each type corresponds to the infinite hierarchy of his probabilistic beliefs about others' probabilistic beliefs. They also showed that any subspace can be approximated arbitrarily closely by a finite subspace.

Another popular examples of the usage of the construction are the induction puzzles. And so is Robert Aumann's construction of common knowledge.

References

Game theory